Sigrun Svenningsen (June 23, 1902 – February 24, 1971) was a Norwegian actress.

Svenningsen was born in Kristiania (now Oslo), the daughter of the traveling salesman Sigurd Svenningsen (1875–1901) and Karen Beate Hoff (1869–?). She had a successful stage career, including as the lead actress at the Chat Noir cabaret in the 1920s. She also performed the lead role in the successful revue Ikke mas, alle får (Don't Worry, Everyone Will Get Some) in 1925 and 1926.

Svenningsen appeared in only two silent films. She debuted in 1924 in Harry Ivarson Til sæters, in which she played a major role as Sigrid. In 1927 Svenningsen appeared in Ivarson's Den glade enke i Trangvik.

Svenningsen was married to the actor Per Kvist.

Filmography 
1924: Til sæters
1927: Den glade enke i Trangvik

References

External links
 

1902 births
1971 deaths
Norwegian silent film actresses
20th-century Norwegian actresses
Actresses from Oslo